Friedrich von Löffelholz (7 March 1955 – 2 October 2017) was a German cyclist. He competed in the team time trial event at the 1976 Summer Olympics.

References

External links
 

1955 births
2017 deaths
German male cyclists
Olympic cyclists of West Germany
Cyclists at the 1976 Summer Olympics
Sportspeople from Nuremberg
Cyclists from Bavaria